USS Mackerel may refer to:

 , was a  launched 28 September 1940 and served as a training submarine during World War II
 , was a  launched 17 July 1953, and served as a training and testing submarine until 1978

United States Navy ship names